Burgl is a given name. Notable people with the name include:

Burgl Färbinger (born 1945), German alpine skier 
Burgl Heckmair (born 1976), German snowboarder

See also
Burl (given name)